Brian Crosby is an American author, educator, and newspaper columnist. He writes "The Crosby Chronicles" blog for the Glendale News-Press. He is a national board-certified teacher and has taught high school English for 31 years at Herbert Hoover High School in Glendale, California. He retired from teaching in 2020. , he is the co-chair of the English Department at Herbert Hoover High School in Glendale, California. He has written two books about teaching and the educational system. His 2002 book, The $100,000 Teacher: A Teacher's Solution to America's Declining Public School System was honored by ForeWord magazine as the Book of the Year in Education.

Published works 
 Crosby, Brian (2002). The $100,000 Teacher: A Solution to America's Declining Public School System, Capital Books, 288 pages. 
 Crosby, Brian (2008). Smart Kids, Bad Schools: 38 Ways to Save America's Future, Thomas Dunne Books, 320 pages.

References

External links 
 

American columnists
American educators
Living people
Year of birth missing (living people)